John Lithgow is an American actor, musician, and author.

John Lithgow may also refer to:

John Lithgow (New Zealand politician) (1933–2004)
John T. Lithgow, former acting Commissioner of Yukon